Hexastylis arifolia, or the little brown jug,  is a perennial wildflower in the family Aristolochiaceae found in the southeastern United States, from Louisiana to Virginia, inland as far as Kentucky. It is considered a threatened species in Florida.

Description
Hexastylis arifolia is an evergreen, perennial herb with no above-ground stems, spreading by means of underground rhizomes.

Leaves are hairless, of two sorts. Small, scale-like leaves adhere to the underground rhizomes, while larger green, heart-shaped leaves emerge above ground. Flowers are formed one at a time, on the ends of the rhizomes.

References

Aristolochiaceae
Endemic flora of the United States
Flora of the Southeastern United States
Flora of the Appalachian Mountains
Plants described in 1803
Taxa named by André Michaux
Taxa named by John Kunkel Small